Archie Campbell may refer to:

Archie Campbell (judge) (1942–2007), Canadian jurist
Archie Campbell (politician) (1874–1955), New Zealand politician
Archie Campbell (comedian)  (1914–1987), American comedian
Archie Campbell (baseball) (1903–1989), MLB player
Archie Campbell (footballer, born 1880) (1880–1918), Scottish footballer
Archie Campbell (footballer, born 1904) (1904–1980), English footballer
Archie Campbell (footballer, born 1991), Scottish footballer

See also
Archie Campbell's Cove
Archibald Campbell (disambiguation)